The kishi is a two-faced demon in Angola. According to legend, a kishi has an attractive human man's face on the front of its body and a hyena's face on the back. Kishi are said to use their human face as well as smooth talk and other charms to attract young women, who they then eat with the hyena face. The hyena face is said to have long sharp teeth and jaws so strong they cannot be pulled off anything it bites.

The word kishi, nkishi, or mukisi means "spirit" in several Bantu languages spoken in Democratic Republic of the Congo, Republic of the Congo, northern Zambia, and Angola.

References

African demons
Angolan culture
Mythological human hybrids
Southern African legendary creatures